Werner Haase (23 February 1934 – 15 November 2014) was a German cross-country skier. He competed in the men's 15 kilometre event at the 1960 Winter Olympics.

References

External links
 

1934 births
2014 deaths
German male cross-country skiers
Olympic cross-country skiers of the United Team of Germany
Cross-country skiers at the 1960 Winter Olympics
People from Oberharz am Brocken
Sportspeople from Saxony-Anhalt